Asazuki (PLH-35) is a Reimei-class patrol vessel currently operated by the Japanese Coast Guard.

Design

Construction and career 
Asazuki was laid down on 25 February 2019 and launched on 15 December 2020 by Mitsubishi, Shimonoseki. She was commissioned on 12 November 2021.

References

Bibliography
 
 
 

Shikishima-class patrol vessels
2020 ships
Ships built by Mitsubishi Heavy Industries